The 1991 San Marino motorcycle Grand Prix was the twelfth round of the 1991 Grand Prix motorcycle racing season. It took place on the weekend of 16–18 August 1991 at the Mugello Circuit.

500 cc race report
5th pole of the season for Kevin Schwantz. Wayne Rainey gets the start from Wayne Gardner, Schwantz and Mick Doohan.

Rainey and Doohan get away, Doohan superior on the brakes at the end of the straight. Schwantz is a close 3rd.

Rainey drops Doohan, who is caught by Schwantz.

500 cc classification

References

San Marino and Rimini Riviera motorcycle Grand Prix
San Marino
San Marino motorcycle
San Marino Motorcycle Grand Prix